Oxipurinol (INN, or oxypurinol USAN) is an inhibitor of xanthine oxidase. It is an active metabolite of allopurinol and it is cleared renally. In cases of renal disease, this metabolite will accumulate to toxic levels. By inhibiting xanthine oxidase, it reduces uric acid production. High serum uric acid levels may result in gout, kidney stones, and other medical conditions.

References

Pyrazolopyrimidines
Xanthine oxidase inhibitors
Human drug metabolites